Natalie Bible' (born November 9, 1983) is an American film director, screenwriter, editor, and film producer.

Life and career
Bible' was born and raised in Knoxville, Tennessee. Her first feature film Windsor Drive  which she directed, edited, and produced was distributed theatrically by Indican Pictures in 2015. The film stars Samaire Armstrong, Tommy O'Reilly, Jillian Murray, Mandy Musgrave, and Matt Cohen.

In 2016, Bible' was working on her second feature William Froste.

In April 2022, Bible was set to direct and co-write High Tide starring Andrew Keegan and Sonalii Castillo.

Filmography

References

External links
 Official website
 

1983 births
Living people
American film directors
American women film directors
21st-century American women